Sihanoukville, also known as Kampong Som, is a coastal city in Cambodia and the capital of Preah Sihanouk Province, at the tip of an elevated peninsula in the country's south-west on the Gulf of Thailand. The city is flanked by an almost uninterrupted string of beaches along its entire coastline and coastal marshlands bordering the Ream National Park in the east. The city has one navigable river, the mangrove lined Ou Trojak Jet running from Otres Pagoda to the sea at Otres. A number of thinly inhabited islands – under Sihanoukville's administration – are near the city, where in recent years moderate development has helped to attract a sizable portion of Asia's individual travelers, students, and backpackers.

The city, which was named in honour of former king Norodom Sihanouk, had a population of around 89,800 people and approximately 66,700 in its urban center in 2008. Sihanoukville city encompasses the greater part of six communes (Sangkats) of Sihanoukville Province. A relatively young city, it has evolved in parallel with the construction of the Sihanoukville Autonomous Port, which commenced in June 1955, as the country's gateway to direct and unrestricted international sea trade. The only deep water port in Cambodia includes an oil terminal and a transport logistics facility. As a consequence, the city grew to become a leading national center of trade, commerce, transport, and process manufacturing.

Sihanoukville's many beaches and nearby islands make it Cambodia's premier seaside resort with steadily rising numbers of national visitors and international tourists since the late-20th century.

As a result of its economic diversity, the region's natural environment, and the recreational potential, an increasing number of seasonal and permanent foreign residents make Sihanoukville one of the most culturally varied and dynamic population centers in Cambodia.  tourism remains insignificant in comparison with neighboring Thailand. Sihanoukville's future will largely be defined by the authorities' ability to successfully manage natural resources on the one hand and the necessities of urban and insular development, increasing visitor numbers, expanding infrastructure, the industrial sector and population growth, on the other.

Despite being the country's premier sea side destination, after decades of war and upheaval the town and its infrastructure remain very much disjointed and architecturally unimpressive. Infrastructure problems persist, in particular related to water and power supply, while international standard health facilities remain limited.

Sihanoukville also faces challenges related to crime, security, and safety with the city frequently being the focus of scandals linked to serious organized crime, petty crime, and corruption.

In recent years, Sihanoukville has seen unprecedented levels of Chinese investment into the city with numerous casinos having opened up throughout the city. Demographically, the city's ethnic make up has changed with nearly 80,000 mainland Chinese workers, developers and investors accounting for 90% of the city's expat population as of 2019. Mandarin signage is increasingly replacing Khmer and English signage in the city and crime in the form of drunken violence and organized crime are increasing. Sihanoukville is one of the major cities on China's One Belt One Road Initiative.

Etymology
The official name of the city in Khmer is: krong ('city'), preah ('holy') Sihanouk (name of the former king), which adds up to: 'City of the holy Sihanouk'
or 'Honorable Sihanouk City'. King Norodom Sihanouk (reigned 1941–1955, 1993–2004) was and still is revered as father of the (modern) nation. The name Sihanouk is derived from Sanskrit through two Pali words: siha ('lion'), and hanu ('jaws').

The alternative name, Kompong Saom (also romanized as Kompong Som and Kampong Som), means 'Port of the Moon' or 'Shiva's Port'. Saom is derived from the Sanskrit word saumya, the original (Rig Vedic) meaning of which was Soma, the 'juice or sacrifice of the moon-god', but evolved into Pali 'moon', 'moonlike' 'name of Shiva'. The word kampong or kompong is of Malay origin and means 'village' or 'hamlet'. Its meaning underwent extension towards 'pier' or river 'landing bridge'.

History

Classical period (before 1700)
Prior to the ports' and city's foundation works of 1955, the port of Kompong Som must have been only of regional significance due to the absence of navigable waterways that connect the port with the kingdom's settlement centers. During the many centuries of pre-Angkorian and Angkorian history – from Funan to Chenla and during the Khmer Empire, regional trade was centered at O Keo (Vietnamese: Óc Eo) in the Mekong Delta, now the province of Rạch Giá in Vietnam. The township of Prei Nokor (Saigon) was a commercial center of the Khmer Empire.

The Chronicle of Samtec Cauva Vamn Juon, one of the 18th and 19th century Cambodian Royal Chronicles, briefly mentions the region as the country was split into three parts during a nine-year civil war from 1476 to 1485: "In 1479, Dhammaraja took on the throne at Chatomuk (Phnom Penh) and controlled the provinces of Samraong Tong, Thbong, Kompong Saom, Kampot up to the Bassak, Preah Trapeang, Kramuon Sah, Koh Slaket and Peam" (mouth of the Mekong).

Early modern period (c. 1700–1863)
From the end of the 17th century, Cambodia lost control of the Mekong River route as Vietnamese power expanded into the lower Mekong. During the Nguyen-Siamese War (1717–1718) a Siamese fleet burned the port of Kompong Som in 1717 but was defeated by the Vietnamese at Banteay Meas/Ha Tien. A Cambodian king of the late-18th century, Outey-Reachea III allied with a Chinese pirate, Mac-Thien-Tu, who had established an autonomous polity based in Ha Tien and controlled the maritime network in the eastern part of the Gulf of Thailand. Ha Tien was at a point where a river linking to the Bassac River flows into the Gulf of Thailand. Landlocked Cambodia tried to keep its access to maritime trade through Ha Tien. In 1757 Ha Tien acquired the ports of Kampot and Kompong Som as a reward for Mac's military support to the King of Cambodia. Until its destruction in 1771 the port developed into an independent duty-free entrepôt linked with several Chinese trading networks.

Alexander Hamilton, who traveled to the Gulf of Thailand in 1720, wrote that "Kompong Som and Banteay Meas (later Ha Tien) belonged to Cambodia, as Cochin-China was divided from Cambodia by a river (Bassac River) of three leagues broad." and "King Ang Duong constructed a road from his capital of Oudong to Kampot". Kampot remained the only international seaport of Cambodia. "The traveling time between Udong and Kampot was eight days by oxcart and four days by elephants." French Résident Adhemard Leclère wrote: "...Until 1840s, the Vietnamese governed Kampot and Péam [Mekong Delta], but Kompong Som belonged to Cambodia. The Vietnamese constructed a road from Ha Tien to Svai village, on the border with Kompong-Som, via Kampot."

The British Empire followed a distinct policy by the 1850s, seeking to consolidate its influence. Eyewitness reports give rare insights, as Foreign Secretary Lord Palmerston's agent John Crawfurd reports: "Cambodia was...the Keystone of our policy in these countries, - the King of that ancient Kingdom is ready to throw himself under the protection of any European nation...The Vietnamese were interfering with the trade at Kampot, and this would be the basis of an approach..." Palmerston concluded: "The trade at Kampot - one of the few remaining ports, could never be considerable, in consequence of the main entrance to the country, the Mekong, with all its feeders flowing into the Sea through the territory of Cochin China The country, too, had been devastated by recent Siam - Vietnam wars. Thus, without the aid of Great Britain, Kampot or any other port in Cambodia, can never become a commercial Emporium." Crawfurd later wrote: "The Cambodians...sought to use intervals of peace in the Siam - Vietnam wars to develop intercourse with outside nations. The trade at Kampot which they sought to foster was imperiled by pirates. Here is a point where the wedge might be inserted, that would open the interior of the Indo-Chinese Peninsula to British Commerce, as the great River of the Cambodians traverses its entire length and even affords communication into the heart of Siam".

French rule (1863–1954)

Under French rule Vietnam, Laos, and Cambodia became a single administrative and economic unit. The coastal region Circonscription Résidentielle with Kampot as its capital contained the arrondissements of Kampot, Kompong Som, Trang, and Kong-Pisey. The establishment of another international trading center near the existing city of Saigon was not considered necessary. Focus remained the Mekong and the idea to establish an alternative route to Chinese and Thai markets along an uninterrupted navigable waterway all the way south to the Mekong Delta.

Insurrection
An insurrection that took place from 1885 to 1887 further discouraged French ambition. It started in Kampot and quickly spread to Veal Rinh, Kampong Seila, and Kompong Som, where the insurgents were led by a Chinese pirate named Quan-Khiem. He managed to control the northern part of Preah Sihanouk for some time until he—an old man—was arrested by the local governor.

The most notable infrastructural improvements of this period were the construction of Route Coloniale No. 17, later renamed National Road No.3 and the national railway system, although work on the "Southern Line", from Phnom Penh to Sihanoukville, only began in 1960.

After independence (since 1954)
The city's and province's alternative name Kampong som (Kampong Som) was adopted from the local indigenous community. After the dissolution of French Indochina in 1954, it became apparent that the steadily tightening control of the Mekong Delta by Vietnam required a solution to gain unrestricted access to the seas. Plans were made to construct an entirely new deep-water port. Kompong Saom (Kampong Som)  was selected for water depth and ease of access. In August 1955, a French/Cambodian construction team cut a base camp into the unoccupied jungle in the area that is now known as Hawaii Beach. Funds for construction of the port came from France and the road was financed by the United States.

During the Vietnam War the port became a military facility for both sides: in the service of National Front for the Liberation of South Vietnam and after 1970, under the government of Lon Nol, in the service of the United States.

The port was the last place to be evacuated by the US Army, only days before Khmer Rouge guerrillas took control of the government in April 1975. The events surrounding the taking of the US container ship SS Mayaguez and its crew on 12 May by the Khmer Rouge and the subsequent rescue operation by US Marines played out on the waters of Koh Tang off the coast of Sihanoukville. During the two days of action, the US commenced air strikes on targets on the mainland of Sihanoukville including the port, the Ream Naval Base, an airfield, the railroad yard and the petroleum refinery in addition to strikes and naval gun fire on several islands.

After the fall of the Khmer Rouge regime in 1979 and the subsequent opening of the economy, the port of Sihanoukville resumed its importance in the development and recovery of the country. With the further opening of new markets in 1999, the city regained its role in the economic growth of Cambodia.

In 1993, Ream National Park was established per royal decree of former King Sihanouk.

The Sihanoukville Municipality was elevated to a regular province on 22 December 2008 after King Norodom Sihamoni signed a royal decree converting the municipalities of Kep, Pailin, and Sihanoukville into provinces.

In 2006 the Koh Puos (Cambodia) Investment Group submitted an application, planning to invest US$276 million in converting the 116 hectare Koh Puos, Snake Island, into a luxury residential and resort complex. After the completion of certain elements of the infrastructure, the investor announced alterations of the original blueprints, as "Reapplying for permission will happen in 2014..." according to the Council of the Development of Cambodia.

On 26 May 2011 Preah Sihanouk area joined the Paris-based club, Les Plus Belles Baies Du Monde, ('the most beautiful bays in the world'). The organisation officially accepted the Bay of Cambodia as one of its members at its 7th General Assembly.

Geography

Topography
Sihanoukville town is at the tip of the rolling hills of a peninsula on the Gulf of Thailand. These hills, that provide a great variety of housing ground, good perspectives on the coastal plains, the beaches, the rivers, the sea and the islands define the region's natural character and value. The Gulf of Thailand's shallow depths and the local climate are moderate in contrast to the South China Sea to the east and the Indian Ocean to the west, where Pacific typhoons and monsoonal extremes are permanent perils.

Architecture and cityscape

As a result of its clearly defined purpose, its very brief but turbulent history, and its location, Sihanoukville is distinct from other urban centers in Cambodia. Established after the period of the French Protectorate, bourgeois colonial style quarters such as ones seen in Kampot, Siem Reap, or Phnom Penh do not exist. Architecture and street layout are subject to modern concepts of reduction and functionality. Cambodian architect Vann Molyvann designed objects, public buildings with a distinct function, some still operational. This brief era of New Khmer Architecture ended in 1970. Inconsistency and chaos during the long civil wars had far greater impact on the city's current image.

In 1959 the first urban plan for the city was completed for a population of 55,000 residents; it included cycle paths and green spaces. The plan also clearly marked out zoning for the port, the railway network, the town center with municipal offices, business and residential housing, and finally a tourist zone to the south along the beaches. A feasibility study by the United States Operations Mission (USOM) looked at drawing on a new water supply from the Prek Tuk Sap and existing lagoons; these were subsequently improved (cut off from the sea) and used as the initial source for town supply. The reservoirs are still operational, although insufficient for today's demands.

The years of turmoil that followed meant that little of the original plan was implemented. The current state of structural inconsistency is testimony to decades of upheaval as layout planning was by no means a subject of aesthetic considerations and applied sciences.

The area connects with the city center along a single highway via typical irregular successions of residential buildings, bare of any distinct features and landmarks. These highways were designed to connect the very few and widely dispersed actual settlement foundations. The neighborhoods lack intimacy, due to a one-dimensional infrastructure. The city's center is a sequence of alternating single blocks of solid urban edifices, such as banks, middle-class hotels, gas stations, pharmacies, Chinese bakeries and electronics retailers followed by long rows of low-end food stalls, makeshift shops, motor-bike repair services, mini-markets, laundry, gas, lock-picker services and mobile phone shops.

Gallery of Ochheuteal, Serendipity and Ostres Beach area

Rivers
Due to the proximity to the sea, mangroves line large parts of the rivers.

The mangrove-lined Ou Trojak Jet river runs from Otres Pagoda to Otres Beach is Sihanoukville's longest river. In the tidal mangrove area barramundi, mangrove jacks and barracuda are the prize target for sport anglers, the lower section harbours a marina. Restaurants along the south bank of the river serve fresh seafood supplied by the local inshore fishing boats.

Islands

All the islands listed below fall under administration of Sihanoukville's Mittakpheap District. The majority is either in the process of or has been assigned for extensive tourism. Koh Rong and Koh Rong Sanloem in particular have so far undergone years of uncoordinated development. A number of guesthouses and bungalow resorts offers accommodation of greatly varying standard by the beaches or in the lush jungle. Despite the very moderate infrastructure, visitor numbers have risen quickly and Koh Rong has been declared a stop on the Banana Pancake Trail.
The terrain is predominantly hilly with a sizable mountain  at the island's north-west. The hills provide water for creeks, lagoons and estuaries. The island's interior is almost completely forested. Although there are already many guest houses and pubs in and around Koh Tuich village, the island remains virtually deserted – its sheer size dwarfs all settlement centres. , there is a well-functioning ferry network between Sihanoukville and Koh Rong.
 Koh Rong Sanloem: South of Koh Rong and smaller beaches are on the west and east coast. It resembles its bigger neighbour Koh Rong in shape and geography – although a bit thinner, it is covered in dense forest, generally more flat (still, though there are sizable hills) and has noticeably less landmass in relation to its coastline. Marine life around Koh Rong Sanloem is very diverse and offers many diving spots. , there is a well-functioning ferry network between Sihanoukville and Koh Rong Sanloem.
 Koh Kaong Kang/Thass: Mangrove Island, Ile des Paletuviers (old French name), Koh Kaong Kang/Thass – one of the inner islands – it is a popular place for snorkelers. Koh Kaong Kang/Thass is very flat, hence freshwater is scarce - one of the reasons why nobody lives there permanently.
 Koh Koun: 'Child Island', 'Ile de Cone' (old French name), a small island between Koh Rong and Koh Rong Sanloem, has no beach and is uninhabited.
 Koh Tuich: 'Small Island', a tiny island off Koh Rong's Koh Tuich village. There is a little pagoda on it in service since around 2010.
 Koh Puos: also known as 'Snake Island' or 'Morakot Island'. It is under development by Russian investors and converted into a luxury holiday destination and high standard residential area. Snake Island is linked to the mainland via a regular road bridge since around July 2011. The bridge is currently not open for public traffic.
 Koh Bong Po-oun/Song Saa: – 'Siblings/Lovers Islands' – Les Frères (old French name), renamed to Koh Song Saa. Two tiny islets off Koh Rong's north-east.

Environment
The urban area suffers from polluted water supplies which render tap water non-potable. Waste management policies and practices are deficient or lacking altogether.

Climate

Sihanoukville lies in the Tropical monsoon (Am) climate zone. The city has two seasons: a wet season and a dry season.

Minimum night temperatures sporadically fall below . in January, the coldest month. May is the warmest month - although strongly influenced by the beginning of the wet season, as the area constitutes the easternmost fringe of the south-west monsoon. Tropical cyclones only rarely cause damage in Cambodia.

The total annual rainfall averages around 2200 millimeters (86.6 inches). The maximal amounts fall in July, August and September. Relative humidity is high throughout the entire year; usually exceeding 90 percent. During the dry season daytime humidity rates average around 50 percent or slightly lower, climbing to about 90 percent during the rainy season. The wet season runs from April to November, and the dry season from December to March. However, as is common in places with this climate type, the dry season still sees some rainfall.

Economy

Sihanoukville was established as an international marine gateway and as a result the local economy is largely defined by its deep water port and the nearby oil terminal. Attached is a regularly modernized cargo storage and logistics facility which serves numerous shipping companies, freight forwarders, suppliers, and maintenance contractors. All of these are based in the port's vicinity. The Phnom Penh–Sihanoukville transport corridor is the premier national trade route, accounting for about 75 percent of Cambodia's trade traffic.

Other sizable economic sectors of the city are fisheries, aqua-culture, and frozen shrimp processing, the garment industry, food production, and processing, the constantly growing tourism industry with a noticeably developed service branch and the associated real estate market.

Sihanoukville Special Economic Zone

The Sihanoukville Special Economic Zone (SSEZ) is an overseas economic and trade cooperation zone which was designed to promote favorable market conditions such as: policy advantages, a safe political environment, favorable trade status, completed infrastructure supporting, low labor costs, and excellent services. In addition to its areas around the port, a sizable industrial center, exclusively composed of Chinese companies has been developed since 2010.

Trade
Trading accounts for a high percentage of the city's economy. The city imports goods from Thailand, Hong Kong, Singapore, and China while it exports goods to the United States, Canada, Germany, and the United Kingdom. The city often re-exported many of the goods it imported such as electronics, cigarettes, vehicles and gold. Today, the city's main export is garments, but it also produces and exports timber, logs, and rubber in small quantities.

Cambodia is one of the few least developed countries (LDCs) to export over US$2 billion. Since Cambodia became the first LDC to join the World Trade Organization (WTO) in 2004, trade has steadily increased, and the U.S. has been Cambodia's largest trading partner. Comparing to US$2.3 billion of export to the U.S and US$153 million of export to Cambodia in 2010, from January to October 2011, Cambodia's exports to the U.S. were US$2.29 billion and U.S. exports to Cambodia were US$152.6 million.

Economic prospects
The city's development strategy focuses on tourism, port expansion, and industrial growth. Tourism development is expected to be an economic driver leading to the development of a national commercial center and is already producing rapid growth in the surrounding area. It is anticipated that the port, as a hub for the expansion of maritime transport, will attract additional industry. An industrial zone has been established that includes petrochemical production and food processing based on local fisheries and other elements.  With new investments in these areas and associated development strategies, planners anticipate increased urbanization of Sihanoukville, alongside growing economic opportunities that will lead to migration from rural areas.

Foreign investment in Cambodia has increased significantly since 2004 led by Asian investors from countries such as Malaysia, China, Korea, Thailand, and Vietnam. Approved investment proposals by the Council for the Development of Cambodia totaled around US$500 million in 2011. Chinese investments has since modified the city's character, partly destroying its Cambodian aesthetics and culture. The Diplomat reported that "unchecked development by Chinese investors has come at a cost, freezing out locals and changing the city’s character." Evictions of native Cambodians due to economic investments by the Chinese has led to ethnic conflicts, with the government supporting the Chinese investors.

Sihanoukville Port Special Economic Zone

The Sihanoukville Autonomous Port has an independent administration. In combination with the related logistics and transport sector it is the city's economic backbone.

At present, the total operational land area of the Sihanoukville Autonomous Port is around 124.76 ha. The Old Jetty was constructed in 1956 and became operational in 1960. The exterior berth is  depth, while the interior berth is  depth.

At present, this new quay can accommodate three vessels with  draft medium GRT.

The primary destinations of Sihanoukville Autonomous Port are: Singapore, Hong Kong, Bangkok, Ho Chi Minh City, Shanghai, Laem Chabang, Yantian and Kaohsiung. It has a frequency of scheduled services of 38 per week.

Transport

Roads and streets 

 National Highway 4 (NH4): Phnom Penh and Sihanoukville are connected via National Road 4. The road was built and financed by the United States to accommodate heavy freight containers and gasoline tank trucks connecting the deep-water port with Phnom Penh. However, it is considered the most dangerous road of Cambodia. Residential areas and the attached local traffic merges with the speeding traffic. Traffic accidents result.
 National Highway 3: Connects Sihanoukville with Kampot Province. The road joins NR4 at Prey Nob District at the junction town of Veal Rinh. It is sealed, but lacks traffic signs. Free roaming cattle and other livestock regularly block road traffic. The road underwent significant refurbishment in 2008 and forms part of an international "north-south economic corridor" from Kunming in China to Bangkok in Thailand.
 National Highway 48: Connects Sihanoukville and Phnom Penh with Koh Kong Province to the southwest. The road ends at the Thai-Cambodian border.

Urban traffic
Cambodia's official driving side is the right side of the road. There is no formally adopted road and road transport policy in Cambodia, and this particularly affects urban road transport.

Although Cambodia's traffic laws are the same as those of any other country, with respect to the country's membership of the ASEAN, that requires recognition of ratified agreements, regular traffic only functions on a basic level and in times of low density. Conduct is still traditional as smaller and slower vehicles are expected to yield to big vehicles.

Law enforcement has been accused of failing to enforce international norms. A habit of running predictable checkpoints has developed over the last years. Tourists on rental bikes and common people are often stopped and forced to pay, often based on mere assumptions and unsupported claims. Drivers of vehicles with perceived social status remain generally unmolested. Consequently, the deterrent effect of these activities is very low.

In all urban and residential areas an overabundance of motorbikes exists due to the absence of any form of public transportation and taxi-cars. For non-residential and inexperienced people Sihanoukville city remains unsafe for driving. Drivers of motorbikes often do not wear helmets, drive indiscriminately on any side of the street and it is common to see motorbikes with more than two passengers or vehicles driven by children. Traffic lights are often ignored.

In 2008 the government ordered the countrywide enforcement of the use of helmets, but the order was not thoroughly enforced.

Public and individual transport

The city does not have any form of public transportation. Local administration does issue transport licences for any individual of the informal urban transportation system of motor-taxis (moto-dups) and tuk-tuks. The system is not administered by authorities, as anybody can become a motor-taxi - or tuk-tuk driver. As a consequence, prices of services are ad hoc, insurance non-existent and service quality varies considerably. The overwhelming majority of drivers do not have knowledge of street names and/or numbers.

Airport

Sihanouk International Airport (International Air Transport Association code KOS) was formerly called Kang Keng Airport (ព្រលានយន្តហោះ កង កេង), named after the Minister of Health of the Khmer Republican regime during the 1970s. The airport is in Ream Commune in central Sihanoukville Province.

, there were close to 200 flights from China to Sihanoukville every week.

Long distance buses and taxis 

The central long-distance bus station for all transport business operators is on National Highway 4 in the city's north-east near the Autonomous Port. Transport business operators maintain booking offices in the urban centers.

Sihanoukville is served by many competing companies with daily scheduled services from and to all major population centers in Cambodia. Direct destinations are Phnom Penh, Koh Kong (city), and Kampot. Some companies offer services to Ho Chi Minh City in Vietnam and to Siem Reap near Angkor Wat. Buses operate from the early morning until the afternoon plus a daily night-bus/sleeper.

Privately operated taxi stands for long-distance transportation are found at the central bus station, in the commercial urban center and the tourist center in the South.

Marine transport, island access, ferries 
The last daily national official marine ferry service from/to Sihanoukville city to/from Krong Koh Kong ceased operation with the completion of National Highway 48 in 2007.

Koh Rong island and Koh Rong Sanloem island have daily ferry service.

Access to smaller islands is generally provided by local holiday resorts, Otres marina, dive operators or private operators. Additionally, small long-tail boats and medium size cruising boats can be individually hired for sightseeing, fishing, diving and drinking trips at Otres marina, guest-houses, travel agencies and diving operators.

It is at the local port's pier, near Koh Preab Island. (coordinates: 10° 39' 59" N / 103° 30' 41" E).

Holiday cruise ships infrequently stop at the port during their voyages in Southeast Asia.

Rail transport 

The railway network of Cambodia was re-constructed for freight transport during the last years by Toll Holdings, which has obtained a building and maintenance concession from the Royal Cambodian Railway.

Currently a weekend passenger train service runs from the station near the Autonomous Port used to manage passenger train transportation to Phnom Penh via Kampot

Demographics 

The 2008 census of Cambodia counted 89,846 inhabitants of Sihanoukville City and approximately 66,700 in its urban center.

The population of the city is apart from descendants of the indigenous inhabitants not older than three generations as the product of recent history, such as the Cambodian diaspora and Cambodian humanitarian crisis of and after the Pol Pot era. Historic events which led to demographic upheavals in Cambodia are evident in the demographic trends of the city. With the arrival of displaced refugees, in subsequent decades and centuries, a non-Khmer, mixed Asian population grew to a high percentage of the total population in the core population in urban areas.

In addition to Khmer,  ethnic groups like Vietnamese, Chinese, Cham, Thai, Korean, French, British, Europeans, Australians and Americans live in the urban area. Due to its status as an international port, high volume and density of commerce and the impact of the service sector related to the tourist industry, Krong Preah Sihanouk has a relative high Human Development Index (HDI) of 0.750, compared to the national average HDI of 0.523.

In late-2018 Channel News Asia estimated that the Chinese resident population of the province had risen to 78,000.

Health
Cambodia still has one of the worst health infrastructures in Asia, although the situation is slowly changing for the better. The public health system has suffered from war and neglect and has had serious difficulties meeting the health needs of the population. Some government hospitals and other health units have been rehabilitated so that they are autonomous entities, staffed with qualified personnel. This has led to a significant improvement of health services. At the same time, modern standard private clinics, including local and foreign service providers, are increasing in number and are competing with state-owned hospitals.

Sanitation practices in rural Cambodia are often primitive. The water supply is the main problem; rivers and streams are common sources of drinking water and of water for cooking. These water sources are often the same ones used for bathing, washing clothes, and disposing of waste products. Adequate sewage disposal is nonexistent in most rural and suburban areas.

Security
Sihanoukville faces challenges related to crime, security and safety with the city frequently being the focus of scandals linked to serious organized crime, petty crime and corruption.

The police force, especially the traffic police, have often been shown to be corrupt and ineffective in the city and newspaper investigations have uncovered connections to organized crime and drug trafficking.

Embassies and consular officials have issued cautionary statements about travel to Sihanoukville following gang disputes and a number of high-profile murders, rapes and robberies as well as a number of unexplained deaths of foreigners.

Like many towns and cities in Southeast Asia with sub-standard security and judicial systems, Sihanoukville has also been an attractive target for foreign criminals to hide and engage in nefarious activities. Russian tycoon Sergei Polonsky was deported from Cambodia in May 2015 to face embezzlement charges in Russia after years spent clashing with other Russians on the streets of Sihanoukville Doroshenko Says Oligarch Polonsky Is Trying to Kill his Family.

Culture

The majority of municipal inhabitants are of East Asian descent, who profoundly characterize and influence local customs, moral, commerce, cuisine and tradition based on pan-East Asian beliefs and ideas. Cambodian culture is of distinct ancient Khmer origin, accompanied by century-old moderate Chinese and Vietnamese cultural influences. The prolonged presence of foreign and in particular Westerners in Cambodia and Sihanoukville town contributes to a noticeable varied, modern, multi-cultural manifestation, which is increasingly influenced by modern media.

The citizens of Sihanoukville city celebrate all religious, traditional and secular festivities such as Cambodian New Year (April), Chinese New Year (between January and February), Water Festival (November), Pchum Ben (honor to the ancestors in October) and Kathen Ceremony (offerings to the monks), 8January (Day of Cambodian - Vietnamese Friendship) among others.

Many urban families of Chinese or Sino-Khmer descent in Sihanoukville city have for most of Cambodia's history constituted the commercial elite and urban upper classes. Besides the expressed Buddhist faith there is a strong dedication to Confucian work ethics, on commercial conduct and trade procedures while family bonds are very strong.

Tourism
With more than 150 regular hotels in all price-categories among an undisclosed number of guest-houses, Sihanoukville can easily handle current visitor quota and can generally cope with all standard demands. , the islands have a more than ample supply of accommodation, ranging from budget guesthouses and bungalows, to a luxury resort.

Cuisine
The city has a constantly changing, but large number and variety of restaurants and bars. Fresh seafood, especially crab, prawns and ocean fish are common. Due to the ease in which foreigners can set up business there is also a wide variety of places offering foreign cuisines - with the exception of Africa, the nations of all the continents are well represented. There are Western bakeries (3), BBQ Restaurants (7), Vegetarian Restaurans (5), cafés and coffee shops (17), espresso coffee shops (8) and countless bars and pubs (over 250).

Nightlife
As a tropical sea-side resort, Sihanoukville's night life is heavily influenced and characterized by the city's large number of beaches. All along the central tourist area between the Golden Lion Plaza and the Ochheuteal/Serendipity Beaches are international and Western styled night bars, live music venues and all-night beach discothèques.

Most young Cambodians generally prefer to frequent classic style night-clubs with air-conditioning, lavish interiors and which are dedicated to more traditional ways of service procedures and cultural expression.

At Weather Station (Victory) Hill, bar operators tend to adopt certain traditional Asian and local elements of recreational services. Many Westerners consider these establishments as clearly part of the sex industry. With respect to the fact that prostitution is illegal, bar operators publicly avoid procedures that violate local ethic standards.

Administration

Sihanoukville is the capital city of Sihanoukville province and is governed by its deputy governor. Sihanoukville occupies the greater part of four of the five communes or Sangkat (Sangkat Muoy Commune, Sangkat Pi Commune, Sangkat Bei Commune, Sangkat Buon Commune) of Sihanoukville provinces' Mittakpheap District. The port has its own autonomous administration. The Sangkats are divided into 19 villages.

Autonomous Port

Ships' passengers are allowed to visit Sihanoukville town. The terminal itself offers apart from toilets, no further services, such as shopping centers, banking facilities or tourist offices.

Kampong Seila

Kampong Seila district, which belonged to Koh Kong Province was transferred to Sihanoukville Province in January 2009: "The administrative boundaries of Preah Sihanouk municipality and Koh Kong Province shall be adjusted by sub-dividing land from Kampong Seila District in whole and partial land of Sre Ambil District in Koh Kong Province to Preah Sihanouk municipality." Officials were assigned to create a national workshop—also in relation to other provinces—and perform all necessary administrative tasks. The National Institute of Statistics of Cambodia refers in its most recent and preliminary studies to a successful integration of the district, including maps, although official statistics and numbers are expected to come with the next full report. Preah Sihanouk Province's new official domain has incorporated Kompong Seila District.

Religion

Theravada Buddhism is the state religion in Cambodia, with the pagoda as the traditional spiritual center of the community. The most prominent pagodas in the city:
 Upper Pagoda, "Wat Chotynieng", or "Wat Leu"; on a hill, overlooking Sihanoukville bay and dedicated to Samdech Preah Sangareach Chhoun Nath, a Cambodian Buddhist leader, who lived before the Khmer Rouge rule (1975).
 Lower Pagoda, "Wat Krom", in Sihanoukville town. It is dedicated to Yeay Mao, a popular southern Cambodian ancestral spirit surrounded by an illustrious legend. Both - Wat Leu and Wat Krom - are named according to their local geographic location, on top of the hill and down at the bottom of the hill.
 O'tres Pagoda, "Wat Otres", in Otres village. It is by the Ou Tro Jet River, it features a river water garden and sculptures of ancestral spirits in the form of animals both real and legendary.

Sihanoukville city is also home to minor communities of other religions such as: Catholics, Muslims, Protestants and Taoists. Places of worship:
 St. Michael's Church: It is the center of the Catholic communities. The church was built in 1960 by sailors, it is on the same hill as the Upper Pagoda, facing the sea.
 Iber Bikhalifah Mosque: It is the religious center of the local Muslim community. It is in Sihanoukville town, just in the populous, central Psah Leu (upper market) area.

Education

Public spending on education in Cambodia totaled 2.6% (of GDP) .

Cambodian general education is based on the national school curriculum that consists of:

Basic education
The basic education curriculum is divided into three cycles of three years each. The first cycle (grade 1–3) consists of 27–30 lessons per week lasting 40 minutes which are allocated to five main subjects. The second cycle (grade 4–6) consists of the same number of lessons but is slightly different. The third cycle (grade 7–9) consists of 32-35 lessons which are allocated to seven major subjects.

Upper secondary education
The upper secondary education curriculum consists of two different phases. The curriculum for the first phase (grade 10) is identical to the third cycle of primary education. The second phase (grade 11–12) has two main components: compulsory and electives.

The adult literacy rate in Sihanoukville is 95.37%.

The city has experienced shortages of teachers but the situation has improved during the last decade. The 2004 statistics show the following centers of education: 33 pre-schools with 1,670 children, 52 primary schools with 34,863 students, five colleges with 4,794 students; two high schools with 1,449 students; 10 vocational training with 961 students and 13,728 students in private schools. (see also chart below)

Unicef reports: Increase in reach and sustainability of children learning in relevant, inclusive and quality early childhood and basic education through increased institutional capacities.

Private educational institutes in Sihanoukville
 Life University
 University of Management and Economics
 Built Bright University
 Khmer Technology and Management Center
 Don Bosco Technical School
 Don Bosco Hotel School

The École Française de Sihanoukville, a school for French children abroad, was located within the Hun Sen Krong School.

International relations

Twin towns — Sister cities

Sihanoukville is twinned with:
  Miami, Florida, United States
  Seattle, Washington, United States
  Tampa, Florida, United States

References

Further reading
 
 
 
 Kitagawa, T. 2005, "'Kampot' of the belle époque: from the outlet of Cambodia to a colonial rule", in Southeast Asian Studies = Tonan Ajia kenkyu, vol. 42, no. 4,
 Kampot of the Belle Epoque: From the Outlet of Cambodia to a Colonial Resort
 Henri Mouhot: Travels in Siam, Cambodia, Laos, and Annam, White Lotus Co, Ltd.,

External links

 
 Preah Sihanouk Province official homepage

 
Provincial capitals in Cambodia
Cities in Cambodia
Populated places in Sihanoukville province
Gulf of Thailand
Islands of Cambodia
Articles containing video clips
Socialist planned cities